Nicola West is a fictional character from the Australian soap opera Neighbours, played by Imogen Bailey. She made her on-screen debut on 5 May 2008. She departed the show on 8 October 2008. The character has been central to many storylines including an HIV scare, incest and mental illness.

Creation and casting
Nicola was created as Miranda Parker's (Nikki Coghill) younger sister. Model turned actress Imogen Bailey was asked by producers to portray her. Bailey got the part after her agent informed producers that she had been taking acting classes for one year prior, in December 2007 Bailey auditioned and impressed the casting team so much that she received the part two days later. She was signed to a six-month contract. Around the time fellow model Erin McNaught and singer Dean Geyer were also cast as Sienna Cammeniti and Ty Harper respectively. The castings angered the acting industry, who accused Neighbours of hiring celebrities to boost ratings. Of this Brisbane acting agency Ego Management chief, Mark Eaton, commented that credible actors were missing out on job opportunities, adding: "This is all done to try to get viewing figures up – the producers are not worried about the quality of the show at all." Executive producer Susan Bower defended the castings stating the actors were doing extremely well. Bailey began filming her role on 21 January 2008.

Development

Characterisation
Nicola's persona is complex, she has been shown to be manipulative, usually with good intentions. Of this Bailey described her during an interview with the Herald Sun stating: "She's a bit of a vixen, but is quite down to earth as well. When you first see her, she's trying to impress everybody – she's dressed up, her hair is done and there's a lot of make-up, But gradually she feels more comfortable in Ramsay St and realises she doesn't have to do that, so the real her emerges." Defending her 'man eating' ways she added: "She does have a bit of sexual prowess but also has a very big heart and she's not coming from a really bad place. She's just looking for love. She has her femme-fatale moments, but she's a femme fatale with a really big heart and when the doors are closed she's not as sure of herself as she'd like people to think she is." According to Bailey Nicola's best qualities the fact she is a sexy siren and a big trouble-maker.

When you first see Nicola, Bailey states: "If we were judging Nicola on first appearances I would say the word 'Vixen' describes her best". She also defended the first impressions of the character stating:  "She is actually quite a multi-layered character and this made her really interesting to play. She has a lot of emotional baggage from her childhood, she seeks constant validation from men and is a pretty insecure and messed up woman at her core." Of her sisterly image she states: "She plays the smiley happy-go-lucky sister and she causes lots of trouble in the street but what it all comes down to, for Nicola, is her deep need to find love. I guess in a way we all have this need but Nicola's quest for love really does rule her life and causes her to make some wacky decisions..." Of her overall changes Bailey states: "She went through many highs and lows in the six months that I played her and the end of her first chapter was pretty heavy, playing her emotional breakdown was exhausting and challenging but I loved every minute of it."

Incest
In 2008 Nicola was involved in a controversial storyline where it was revealed she had been pursuing a romance with her adoptive nephew Riley Parker (Sweeney Young). Media reported the story after Australian conservative groups voiced their disapproval of the storyline. The media dramatised the plot in the wake of a real life case in which an Austrian man Josef Fritzl raped his daughter, the storyline was likened to the real life case. The Australian Family Association accused the soap opera of using plots mirroring real life events to attract viewers, branding them 'opportunistic'. The president of its Queensland branch commented on the storyline adding: "Is Neighbours redefining itself as some kind of sick mockumentary? Incest is a very sensitive subject that I wouldn't expect a prime-time program aimed at children to be tackling. They are dealing with young minds who can't fully understand or analyse the issues." Susan Bower defended the storyline stating: "It is controversial, but all our stories are handled carefully." The storyline aired regardless of the criticism, in which Heather Pryor (Georgina Andrews) and Bridget Napier (Eloise Mignon) discover their affair.

Storylines
When Nicola first arrives in Erinsborough, she and Riley were revealed to have a past romance. When Riley tries to end it, he can not resist. They then decide to keep seeing each other secretly, despite the fact that she is his adoptive aunt and that Riley was in a relationship with Heather. Heather discovers their affair, ending her romance with him and he and Nicola keep their affair a secret, even though Riley had been reluctant to the idea. She admits to having feelings for Steve Parker (Steve Bastoni) before he and Miranda got married. Nicola later revealed she was only born so her parents could save Miranda's life when she was suffering from cancer, using her cells to treat Miranda's illness.

After Bridget finds them kissing in Riley's car, Riley decides to leave for the Middle East to be a war correspondent – against his family's will. He leaves a goodbye note urging his family not to trust Nicola. After Nicola kisses Steve and tells Miranda, Bridget tells Miranda of Nicola and Riley's affair, Miranda throws Nicola out of her home. Nicola reveals a secret in which Miranda used to be in love with another man, subsequently splitting them up. Nicola becomes good friends with Toadfish Rebecchi (Ryan Moloney) and Callum Jones (Morgan Baker) and moves in with them for a while.

Nicola suffers a needle injury from Pete Ferguson (Kristin Holland), resulting in an HIV scare. She illegally takes a blood sample under Dr. Karl Kennedy's name. Pete tests HIV positive but Nicola's result returns negative. While out walking her dog, Nicola is struck by a car driven by Donna Freedman (Margot Robbie). She is in a coma as a result and when she regains consciousness, she has amnesia, although Bridget suspects she is pretending, as does Steve. It slowly becomes apparent she is pretending to make amends with Miranda, who finds out and kicks her out of the house.

Nicola poisons Steve, who as a result ends up in hospital. Miranda confronts Nicola, and Nicola knocks Miranda to the ground. Nicola is taken away by police. Nicola is sectioned and proved to be suffering from mental illness, believing she is Miranda and that Steve is her husband and Bridget is her daughter.

Reception
Nicola was well received by UK viewers and during a trip to the UK, Bailey stated that she was overwhelmed by support for her character. In 2009, Ruth Deller of entertainment website Lowculture praised Bailey's portrayal of Nicola, citing her as the reason her on-screen family became interesting, she said "Imogen Bailey has done a great job at playing slutty-and-bonkers-aunt Nicola over the past year. She wasn't exactly Izzy, but she made the Parker family interesting, although the sudden sending her into a basket case storyline hasn’t been as interesting as when she was bitchy but loveable a few months ago." TV Soap named Nicola one of Neighbours' "greatest bitches". They said "This blonde bombshell tore up Erinsborough a couple of years ago, seducing her nephew, ruining her sister's marriage and wrecking careers."

See also
List of soap opera villains

References

Neighbours characters
Fictional nurses
Television characters introduced in 2008
Female characters in television
Female villains